Cantharis transmarina is a species of soldier beetle in the family Cantharidae. It is found in North America.

Subspecies
These two subspecies belong to the species Cantharis transmarina:
 Cantharis transmarina scopa (LeConte, 1866)
 Cantharis transmarina transmarina (Motschulsky, 1860)

References

Further reading

 

Cantharidae
Articles created by Qbugbot
Beetles described in 1860